Kulan Xagay is a town in the central Hiran region of Somalia. It's mostly inhabited by the Xawaadle subclan of Hawiye

References
Kulan Xagay

Populated places in Hiran, Somalia